The Fire Plug Stakes is an American Thoroughbred horse race held in January at Laurel Park Racecourse in Laurel, Maryland. It is open to horses four-year-olds and up and is run at six furlongs on the dirt.

An ungraded stakes, it offers a purse of $125,000. The race was named in honor of Fire Plug, a quick and durable horse that ran throughout the east coast from age three to age seven. He was campaigned by his breeder and owner, Arthur Appleton, and trained by Bob Camac. The gelding won or placed in 50 of his 54 lifetime starts, most of those races being sprints. Half of his 29 victories came in graded stakes races, including the J. Edgar Hoover Stakes, the Maryland Breeders' Cup Handicap and the Roman Handicap. The son of King of the North, Fire Plug retired in 1991 at the age of 8 after placing in three stakes that season and winning the final start of his career.

Records 

Speed record: 
 6 furlongs - 1:09.13 - Digger (2010)

Most wins by an owner:
 2 - Ah Day  (2007 & 2008)

Most wins by a jockey:
 2 - Jeremy Rose    (2008 & 2009)
 2 - Rick Wilson    (1995 & 1998)

Most wins by a trainer:
 2 - King T. Leatherbury    (2007 & 2008)

Winners of the Fire Plug Stakes

See also 
 Fire Plug Stakes top three finishers
 Laurel Park Racecourse

References

External links
 Laurel Park website

1993 establishments in Maryland
Triple Crown Prep Races
Laurel Park Racecourse
Horse races in Maryland
Recurring sporting events established in 1993